The fifth (and last) season of SuperStar was launched on Future TV on 24 February 2008. This year, many changes occurred, such as the fact that the Results shows would happen on Thursdays instead of Mondays, so it will allow the audience to have five days to vote for their favorite contestants. Egyptian singer and SuperStar alumni Wael Mansour would host the show with Miss Lebanon 2004 Majdala Khatar, replacing Egyptian anchorman Ayman Qaissouni. Also, the introduction of a new female judge, Jihane, who joined Elias Rahbani, Ziad Boutros and Abdallah El Qaoud. This year, 12 contestants (7 males and 5 females) would get into the final stage. On 24 July 2008, Lebanese contestant Elie Bitar won the contest against Saudi contestant Abdelmajeed Ibrahim.

Even though running for five seasons, SuperStar was eclipsed by rival show Star Academy on LBC in the Middle East, in terms of popularity and ratings, after only its first season. It has been surpassed by Star Academy as the number one Arab show, and did not move the Arab world the way it did during the first season.

Future TV subsequently lost the Idol licence to the MBC network, which in 2011 relaunched the programme as Arab Idol on MBC 1.

Auditions 

Auditions took place in the following cities :

 Beqaa Valley, Lebanon
 Tripoli, Lebanon
 Cairo, Egypt
 Amman, Jordan
 Tunis, Tunisia
 Baghdad, Iraq
 Kuwait City, Kuwait
 Manama, Bahrain
 Casablanca, Morocco

Top 20 

This year's Top 20 featured 9 females and 11 males
The Top 9 females performed on 6 April and Top 11 males performed on 13 April
10 were chosen, and 9 of the remaining 10 came back for a Last Chance show on 20 April
One of the girls chose to drop out of the competition but did not state a reason

Future Television was forced into closing on 9 May, during the 2008 Lebanon conflict. After moving its broadcasting headquarters, the station was back on the air on 13 May at 4:30 p.m (Lebanese Local Time)

Top 12 
The Top 12 was completed on 24 April 2008. It features 5 girls and 7 boys.

On 3 July Diana Sharaneq was originally eliminated but brought back by the judges and again eliminated the next week.

Repertoire

Week 1 (1 May 2008)

Week 2 (8 May 2008)

Week 3 (28 May 2008)

Week 4 (5 June 2008)

Week 5 (12 June 2008)

Week 6 (19 June 2008)

Week 7 (26 June 2008)

Week 8 (3 July 2008)

Week 9 (10 July 2008)

Week 10 (17 July 2008)

Finale (24 July 2008)

External links
SuperStar Official website

SuperStar (Arabic TV series)
Lebanese television series
Television series by Fremantle (company)
2000s Lebanese television series
2008 Lebanese television seasons